Kaske or Kaské is a surname. Notable people with the surname include:

Charlot Kaské (fl. 1763–1765), Shawnee war chief
Karlheinz Kaske (1928–1998), German manager
Robert Kaske (1921–1989), American professor

See also
Kask (surname)

German-language surnames